Richard Rodgers (1902–1979) was an American composer.

Richard Rodgers may also refer to:
Richard Rodgers II (born 1992), American football tight end
Richard Rodgers Sr. (born 1961), American football coach and player
Richard Rodgers, founder of the UK Christian political party The Common Good

Fictional characters 

Richard Alexander Rodgers or Richard Castle, fictional character on the television crime series Castle

See also
Richard Rodgers Theatre, New York City
Richard Rodgers Award (disambiguation)
Richard Rodgers School (disambiguation)
Richard Rogers (disambiguation)